Noël Christopher Browne (20 December 1915 – 21 May 1997) was an Irish politician who served as Minister for Health from 1948 to 1951 and Leader of the National Progressive Democrats from 1958 to 1963. He served as a Teachta Dála (TD) from 1948 to 1954, 1957 to 1973 and 1977 to 1982. He was a Senator for the Dublin University from 1973 to 1977.

He holds the distinction of being one of only seven TDs to be appointed to the cabinet on the start of their first term in the Dáil. As Minister for Health, Browne is credited with waging a successful total war on Tuberculous. However, his attempt to implement the Mother and Child Scheme in effect brought down the First Inter-Party Government of Taoiseach John A. Costello in 1951 and remains one of the greatest political controversies in modern Irish political history. 

Browne was a well-known, but at times highly controversial, public representative and managed to be a TD for five political parties (two of which he co-founded), as well as an independent TD. These were Clann na Poblachta (resigned), Fianna Fáil (expelled), National Progressive Democrats (co-founder), Labour Party (resigned) and the Socialist Labour Party (co-founder). Browne is widely acknowledged to have had a propensity for grudges and feuds, however, he is also widely credited as being a progressive force in Ireland who advocated against corporal punishment and apartheid while supporting contraceptives, abortion and the LGBT community many decades before those posistions became mainstream.

Early life and career
Noël Browne was born at Bath Street in Waterford, but grew up in the Bogside area of Derry. The Browne family also lived in Athlone and Ballinrobe for a period of time. His mother Mary Therese, née Cooney was born in 1885 in Hollymount, County Mayo; a plaque has been erected there in her memory. His father Joseph Brown, an RIC sergeant, later worked as an inspector for the National Society for the Prevention of Cruelty to Children and, partly as a result of this work, all of the Browne family became infected with tuberculosis. Both parents died of the disease during the 1920s; his father was the first to die, leaving only £100 behind to support a wife and seven children. Fearing that if she and the children remained in Ireland that they would be forced into a workhouse, Mary (already by this point dying of TB) sold every possession the Brownes' had and took the family to London, England. With two days of their arrival, Mary was dead, later buried in a pauper's grave. Of her seven children, six contracted tuberculosis. Noël was only one of two Browne children to survive into adulthood after those bouts with TB. The only sibling who survived with him was his brother Jody, who developed both a hunchback and a cleft palate. Because of Jody's conditions, Noël described Jody as completely unwanted by society, which led his sister to commit Jody to a workhouse. There, Jody later died on an operating table when, in Noël's own words, a doctor performed experimental plastic surgery on Jody. Jody too was buried in a pauper's grave.

In 1929, he was admitted free of charge to St Anthony's, a preparatory school in Eastbourne, England. He then won a scholarship to Beaumont College, the Jesuit public school near Old Windsor, Berkshire, where he befriended Neville Chance, a wealthy boy from Dublin. Neville's father, the eminent surgeon Arthur Chance (son of surgeon Sir Arthur Chance), subsequently paid Browne's way through medical school at Trinity College Dublin.

In 1940, while still a student, Browne suffered a serious relapse of tuberculosis. His treatment at a sanatorium in Midhurst, Sussex was paid for by the Chance family. He recovered, passed his medical exams in 1942, and started his career as a medical intern at Dr Steevens' Hospital in Dublin, where he worked under Bethel Solomons He subsequently worked in numerous sanatoria throughout Ireland and England, witnessing the ravages of the disease. He soon concluded that politics was the only way in which he could make an attack on the scourge of tuberculosis.

Entry into politics
The poverty and tragedy that had shaped Browne's childhood deeply affected him. He considered both his survival and his level of education a complete fluke, a stroke of random chance that saved him when he was seemingly destined to die unknown and in poverty like the rest of his family. Browne found this completely distasteful and was moved to enter politics as a means to ensure no one else would suffer the same fate that had befallen his family.

Browne joined the new Irish republican party Clann na Poblachta and was elected to Dáil Éireann for the Dublin South-East constituency at the 1948 general election. To the surprise of many, party leader Seán MacBride chose Browne to be one of the party's two ministers in the new government. Browne became one of the few TDs appointed a Minister on their first day in Dáil Éireann, when he was appointed Minister for Health.

Minister for Health
A 'White Paper' on proposed healthcare reforms had been prepared by the previous government, and resulted in the 1947 Health Act. In February 1948, Browne became Minister for Health and started the reforms advocated by the Paper and introduced by the Act.

The health reforms coincided with the development of a new vaccine and of new drugs (e.g. BCG and penicillin) that helped to treat a previously untreatable group of medical conditions. Browne introduced mass free screening for tuberculosis sufferers and launched a huge construction program to build new hospitals and sanitoria, financed by the income and accumulated investments from the Health Department-controlled Hospital Sweeps funds. This, along with the introduction of Streptomycin, helped dramatically reduce the incidence of tuberculosis in Ireland.

As Minister for Health Browne came into conflict with the bishops of the Catholic Church and the medical profession over the Mother and Child Scheme. This plan, also introduced by the 1947 Health Act, provided for free state-funded healthcare for all mothers and children aged under 16, with no means test, a move which was regarded as radical at the time in Ireland, but not in the rest of Europe. Virtually all doctors in private practice opposed the scheme, because it would undermine the "fee for service" model on which their income depended.

The Church hierarchy, which controlled many hospitals, vigorously opposed the expansion of "socialised medicine" in the Irish republic (though they never objected to its provision via the British National Health Service in Northern Ireland). They claimed that the Mother and Child Scheme interfered with parental rights, and feared that the provision of non-religious medical advice to mothers would lead to birth control contrary to Catholic teaching. They greatly disliked Browne, seeing him as a "Trinity Catholic" (one who had defied the Church's ruling that the faithful should not attend Trinity College Dublin, which had been founded by Protestants and for many years did not allow Catholics to study there).

He was the only government Minister to attend the 1949 Church of Ireland funeral of Douglas Hyde, first President of Ireland.

Under pressure from bishops, the coalition government backed away from the Mother and Child Scheme and forced Browne's resignation as Minister for Health.

He gave his version of events in his resignation speech to the Dáil on 12 April 1951. In particular, he deplored that the government had referred his Scheme to the Church for approval, taking care to describe it to the Church as his plan and not as government policy, giving him no option but to resign as Minister. The Taoiseach, John A. Costello, immediately retorted that "I have seldom listened to a statement in which there were so many—let me say it as charitably as possible—inaccuracies, misstatements and misrepresentations", and delivered his full reply several hours later. Following his departure from government, Browne embarrassed his opponents by arranging for The Irish Times to publish Costello's and MacBride's correspondence with the Catholic hierarchy, which detailed their capitulation to the bishops.

The controversy over the Mother and Child Scheme led to the fall of the coalition government in which Browne had served as a Minister. But Church opposition to socialised medicine continued under the subsequent Fianna Fáil-led government. The hierarchy would not accept a no-means-test mother-and-infant scheme even when Fianna Fáil reduced the age limit from sixteen years to six weeks, and the government again backed down.

Later political career

After his resignation as Minister for Health, Browne left Clann na Poblachta, but was re-elected to the Dáil as an Independent TD from Dublin South-East in the subsequent election.

Browne joined Fianna Fáil in 1953, but lost his Dáil seat at the 1954 general election. He failed to be selected as a candidate for the 1957 general election and he resigned from the party. He was re-elected at that election for Dublin South-East as an Independent TD.

In 1958, he founded the National Progressive Democrats with Jack McQuillan. Browne held on to his seat at the 1961 general election, but in 1963, he and McQuillan joined the Labour Party, disbanding the National Progressive Democrats. However, Browne lost his seat at the 1965 general election.

Throughout the 1960s and 1970s, Browne became a vocal opponent of Apartheid in South Africa; In 1970 Browne was amongst those who protested outside Thomond Park in Limerick and Lansdowne Road in Dublin when Ireland played the South African rugby team. Browne publically called for a "progressively expanding boycott on the importation of South African produce, as advocated by the ANC". 

He was re-elected as a Labour Party TD at the 1969 general election, again for Dublin South-East. He did not seek a nomination by the Labour Party for the 1973 general election, but instead won a seat in Seanad Éireann for Dublin University. He remained in the Seanad until the 1977 general election, when he gained the Dublin Artane seat as an Independent Labour TD, having again failed to get the Party nomination. 

In 1977 Browne was the first Irish parliamentarian to call for law reforms in regards to homosexuality (which was illegal at the time), and in 1979 was one of the few Irish politicians to attend the opening of the Hirschfeld Centre, Dublin’s first full-time LGBT community space. In 2021 Leo Varadkar suggested that during Browne's time in the Seanad, Browne was the first member of the Oireachtas to ever to advocate for therapeutic legal abortion.  

Upon its formation, Browne joined the new Socialist Labour Party and was briefly its only TD, securing election for Dublin North-Central at the 1981 general election. Browne retired from politics at the February 1982 general election.

Offer of presidential candidacy
In 1990, a number of left-wing representatives within the Labour Party, led by Michael D. Higgins, approached Browne and suggested that he should be the party's candidate in the presidential election due later that year. Though in failing health, Browne agreed. However, the offer horrified party leader Dick Spring and his close associates for two reasons. Firstly, the leadership had secretly decided to run Mary Robinson, a barrister and former senator.

Secondly, many around Spring were "appalled" at the idea of running Browne, believing he had "little or no respect for the party" and "was likely in any event to self-destruct as a candidate." When Spring informed Browne by telephone that the party's Administrative Council had chosen Robinson over him, Browne hung up the telephone. Browne spent the remaining seven years of his life constantly criticising Robinson who had gone on to win the election, thus becoming the seventh President of Ireland, and who was considered highly popular during her term. During the campaign he also indicated support for the rival Fine Gael candidate, Austin Currie.

Personality
Few figures in 20th-century Ireland were as controversial as Noël Browne. To his supporters he was a dynamic liberal who stood up to conservative and reactionary Catholicism. To his opponents he was an unstable, temperamental and difficult individual who was the author of most of his own misfortune. Browne further alienated the middle ground in 1986, with the publishing of his autobiography Against the Tide which became what the Irish Times called a "publishing sensation" and sold over 80 thousand copies in short order. Historians like Dr. Ruth Barrington, who had written extensively about Irish health policy and had access to the files from the 1940s and 1950s, questioned the book's reliability.

Writing a decade later, one of the chief officials of the Labour Party, Fergus Finlay, said Browne had developed into a "bad tempered and curmudgeonly old man". Historian and political scientist Maurice Manning wrote that Browne "had the capacity to inspire fierce loyalty, but many of those who worked with and against him over the years found him difficult, self-centred, unwilling to accept the good faith of his opponents and often profoundly unfair in his intolerance of those who disagreed with him". A riposte to these depictions appeared in 2000, based on a much earlier extensive interview with Browne.

However, some of this alleged "difficulty" arose from the fact that Noël Browne was deaf in one ear from an infection.

After retiring from politics, Browne moved with his wife Phyllis to Baile na hAbhann, County Galway, where he died on 21 May 1997, aged 81.

Legacy
In a 2010 RTÉ public poll, he came in the top 10 of Ireland's Greatest.

In 2021 Leo Varadkar gave a dedicated lecture on Noel Browne to students of Trinity College Dublin, in which he summarised Browne's career. Varadkar noted Browne's cantankerous reputation but generally praised Browne, with Varadkar stating that he always "admired his idealism, his passion, and his determination to stand up for the causes and the people he believed in".

References

Sources
 Noël Browne, Against the Tide, Gill & Macmillan, .
 Ruth Barrington, Health, Medicine and Politics in Ireland 1900-1970, Institute of Public Administration, 1987, .
 Fergus Finlay, Snakes and Ladders, New Island Books, 1998, .
Kurt Jacobsen, "An Interview with Dr Noel Browne" in Maverick Voices: Conversations wth Political and Cultural Rebels. Rowman & Littlefield, 2004. 
 Gabriel Kelly et al. (eds), Irish Social Policy in Context, UCD Press, 1999, .
 Maurice Manning, James Dillon: A Biography, Wolfhound Press, 2000, .
 Lorna Siggins, The Woman Who Took Power in the Park, Mainstream Publishing, 1997, .
 John Horgan, Noël Browne: Passionate Outsider, Gill & Macmillan, 2000, .

1915 births
1997 deaths
20th-century Irish medical doctors
Alumni of Trinity College Dublin
Anti-apartheid activists
Clann na Poblachta TDs
Fianna Fáil TDs
Irish abortion-rights activists
Irish birth control activists
Irish LGBT rights activists
Independent TDs
Labour Party (Ireland) TDs
Members of Seanad Éireann for Dublin University
Members of the 13th Dáil
Members of the 13th Seanad
Members of the 14th Dáil
Members of the 16th Dáil
Members of the 17th Dáil
Members of the 19th Dáil
Members of the 21st Dáil
Members of the 22nd Dáil
Ministers for Health (Ireland)
National Progressive Democrats TDs
Politicians from County Waterford